Henryk Struve (also known as Florian Gąsiorowski) (1840–1912) was a Polish philosopher. He has been called "perhaps the most remarkable person in logic in Warsaw in the 19th century". Struve taught philosophy at Warsaw University from 1862 to 1903. He wrote works in Polish, German and Russian.

References

 Roman Murawski (2016) "On the Way to Modern Logic: the case of Polish Logic", pages 183 to 95 in Modern Logic 1850 – 1950, East-West, Birkhäuser

External links
 

1840 births
1912 deaths
Polish logicians
19th-century Polish philosophers
Academic staff of the University of Warsaw